Thiadiaye is a town in the Thiès Region of western Senegal. It is in the M'bour Department. The population in 2012 was 12,168, an increase from the 10,262 counted in 2002.

The town received commune status in 1996. It is on the national route N1, between M'bour and Fatick.

References

External links
Website

Populated places in Thiès Region
Communes of Senegal